Cornel Drăgușin (26 March 1926 – 10 October 2021) was a Romanian football manager who coached the national teams of Iraq, Syria and Romania. He was director of the Romanian FA coaching school from 1990 to 2002, until being replaced by Mircea Rădulescu.

Managerial career
Drăgușin had a short stint as football player, and eventually became a coach at the age of 25. He served as a youth coach with Steaua Bucharest from 1950 to 1953. He then managed the youth team of Progresul Bucuresti, where he won the national youth championship in 1954, before moving up to the reserves and finally the A team, with whom he was runner-up in the Romanian Cup during the 1957–58 season. After two years, he was named assistant coach being part of the Progresul squad that won the Romanian Cup in 1960.

In 1962, the Iraq Football Association opted for a foreign coach from the Eastern Bloc, and appointed the Romanian manager as head coach of the Iraq national team. He was the first foreign coach of Iraq and at the beginning of his period there, he was supervised by colonel Abdul Salam Arif who later became the country's president.

After his return from Iraq in 1963, Drăgușin joined Progresul again with coach Dincă Schileru for the 1963–64 season, before taking charge of the Syrian national team in 1965. Upon his return, the Romanian FA appointed Drăgușin as manager of the Romania under–23 side for a tournament in Central Africa. In 1967, he returned to Progresul for a third spell until 1969, before moving to Steaua Bucharest as assistant manager.

In 1969, he spent nearly two months visiting some of the top English clubs including Manchester United, Chelsea and Arsenal. On his return, he wrote a book, În patria fotbalului – In Football's Homeland released in 1970.

In November 1970, he was recruited by the Romanian Football Federation, for whom he worked until 2002. During that time, he coached the Romania national team, the Under–23, Under–21 sides and the Olympic team. Between 1986 and 1990, he was Emerich Jenei's assistant coach at the Romania national team, which qualified for the 1990 FIFA World Cup in Italy.

Drăgușin was director of the Romanian FA coaching school from 1990 to 2002, a period during which some of best players in Romania obtained their coaching licenses including Dan Petrescu, Gheorghe Hagi, Ilie Dumitrescu, Ioan Andone, Ioan Sabău, Mircea Rednic, Gavril Balint and Dorinel Munteanu.

References

1926 births
2021 deaths
Sportspeople from Bucharest
Romanian football managers
Romanian expatriate football managers
Romanian expatriate sportspeople in Iraq
Romanian expatriate sportspeople in Syria
FC Progresul București managers
Iraq national football team managers
Syria national football team managers
Romania national football team managers